My Gym Partner’s a Monkey: The Big Field Trip is a 2007 television film which aired on January 14, 2007.

The TV-movie would also serve as the second and third aired episodes of the third season of the animated comedy television series My Gym Partner's a Monkey, and the 28th and 29th overall episodes of the series.

Plot
Adam goes on the annual field trip when joining the school band. The trip is usually an experience, but this year, the tour bus crashes into the city's woods and its all because of Adam and his piccolo. They are now lost and they try to survive. The faculty and students cannot survive in the wilderness, as they are afraid of the wilderness, calling the animals "wild animals", when they are really only butterflies, bears, chipmunks, etc. and they are zoo animals. Adam tries to save the day by putting what he has learned at the school into use. When Jake gets Adam's piccolo back a whole army of chipmunks is ready to fire. They eventually get kidnapped while Windsor, Slips, Ingrid and Lupe learn how to get along with the cuddly animals. After the chipmunks see Adam's piccolo, they start to be under Jake's hands. As time went by, he was abusing them and so Adam falls off the tree and so to survive, he starts to take pride, on what CDMS has taught him.

While Jake is king of the chipmunks, Adam gets kidnapped by bears as he was covered in mud and it completely confused them.
When they trash the house (but not Adam), Adam eats a chip and the bears go totally mad. After being saved by Jake, the chipmunks started to throw nuts, but now lets go to the teacher problem, Principal Pixiefrog had himself on the top of the bus with the totally mad team: Coach Gills, Vice-Coach Horace, Mr. Hornbill, Mr. Mandrill and Mrs. Warthog. After that totally wild adventure Adam plays his music with the piccolo, and gets everybody in the bus and when the bears see the chips with Adam, they push and the field trip is finally gonna happen. After leaving the woods, the bus goes to a giant field called The Big Field, Adam finds out that they are actually going in a giant field and the school band uses non-instrumental objects like coconuts, bamboo & antelope bladder, Adam tries to stay in tune with the band and uses his armpits but Mr. Mandrill stops the song and tells Adam that his out of tune and he knows that he's busted!

Reception
Narina Sokolova won an Emmy Award for Outstanding Individual Achievement in Animation in 2007, for her work on the film. Kendall Lyons of Animation Insider gave the film a positive review, saying he "cannot get over the creativity and the free-styled antics of the characters including Adam and Jake. Granted, there are a few scenes that may make someone do double-takes and ask ... 'hey, did they just say that?' or 'hey, did they just do that?' but this is the kind of cartoon that is bright with colorful animation and is intelligent in its writing," and that he "highly appreciate the time the creators took with this movie!"

References

External links

 The Big Field Trip at Internet Movie Database

2007 television films
2007 films
2000s American animated films
American flash animated films
American animated television films
American children's animated adventure films
American children's animated comedy films
Films based on television series
Television films based on television series
Cartoon Network television films
Cartoon Network Studios animated films
Animated films about children
Animated films about monkeys
Animated films about apes
Animated films about snakes
Animated films about birds
Animated films about frogs